The Terek (Tiyrk; , Tərč; , ; , ; , Terk; , ;)  is a major river in the Northern Caucasus. It originates in the Mtskheta-Mtianeti region of Georgia and flows through North Caucasus region of Russia into the Caspian Sea. It rises near the juncture of the Greater Caucasus Mountain Range and the Khokh Range, to the southwest of Mount Kazbek, winding north in a white torrent between the town of Stepantsminda and the village of Gergeti toward the Russian region North Ossetia and the city of Vladikavkaz. It turns east to flow through Chechnya and Dagestan before dividing into two branches which empty into the Caspian Sea. The river is a key natural asset in the region, providing irrigation and hydroelectric power in its upper reaches.

The main cities on the Terek include Vladikavkaz, Mozdok, and Kizlyar. Several minor hydroelectric power stations dam the Terek: Dzau electrostation (in Vladikavkaz), Bekanskaya, and Pavlodolskaya.

The construction of the Dariali Hydropower Plant with a planned installed capacity of 108 MW started in 2011 on the territory of Kazbegi municipality near the Russia–Georgia border.

Leo Tolstoy's novel The Cossacks is set on the Terek and amongst its Cossacks.

Tributaries
The Terek drains most of the northeast Caucasus east into the Caspian just as its sister, the Kuban, drains the northwest Caucasus west into the Black Sea. Its major tributaries are the following. In the west a fan of rivers flows east and northeast into the Terek. These are the east-flowing Malka, the Baksan, the Chegem and the Cherek with its two branches. These three join the Malka just before it reaches the Terek. The Liashen, Urukh, Duradur and Duradon flow northeast, the Ardon and its tributary, the Fiagdon flow north and the Gizeldon drains the north slope of Mount Kazbek and reaches the Terek near the mouth of the Ardon. Then there is the north-flowing part of the Terek with the Darial Pass. The great northwest bend of the Terek is cut off by the northeast-flowing Sunzha which catches most of the north-flowing rivers. These are the north-flowing upper Sunzha, the Assa, the Argun and Khukhulau. East of these are the Aksay and the Aktash which formerly dried up in the lowlands between the Sulak and the Terek. In the east the Sulak drains most of interior Dagestan and turns east to the Caspian before it reaches the Terek.

Human history
The capital of Khazaria, Samandar, may have stood on the banks of the river Terek.

The Terek river was the site of the final defeat of the army of Hulagu, khan of the Ilkhanate, at the hands of the army of Berke, khan of the Golden Horde, led by Berke's nephew, Nogai Khan, in the first civil war of the Mongol Empire, the Berke–Hulagu war of 1262. Also on the river Timur defeated Tokhtamysh in 1395.

The Terek Cossack Host (1577–1832 and 1860– ) had its base in the Terek basin. During the Russian conquest of the Caucasus it was part of the North Caucasus Line.

During World War II, German forces at the end of August 1942 reached the Terek near Mozdok – the farthest extent of German conquests in the Soviet Union – but aside from a small bridgehead were unable to forge further toward the oil fields of Baku, Hitler's objective.  The Germans penetrated the left bank of the Terek reaching Vladikavkaz suburbs and West Gizel, near the now built weather station.

See also 
Terek Cossacks

References

Rivers of North Ossetia–Alania
Rivers of Georgia (country)
Rivers of Kabardino-Balkaria
Ossetia
Rivers of Stavropol Krai
Rivers of Dagestan
International rivers of Europe
International rivers of Asia
Tributaries of the Caspian Sea
Rivers of Chechnya
Caspian Depression